Power of Ten is the tenth studio album by British-Irish singer Chris de Burgh, released in 1992 on A&M Records.

Track listing
All tracks written by Chris de Burgh.
"Where We Will Be Going" – 4:30
"By My Side" – 4:24
"Heart of Darkness" – 4:45
"In Your Eyes" – 4:49
"Separate Tables" – 3:38
"Talk to Me" – 3:51
"The Connemara Coast" (with The Chieftains) – 3:47
"Brother John" – 4:55
"Shine On" – 4:59
"A Celebration" – 3:49
"She Means Everything to Me" – 3:19
"Making the Perfect Man" – 5:16

"Separate Tables" was also recorded as an English duet as well as an English/German duet with Greek singer Vicky Leandros and released on her 2000 album Jetzt!.
Lyrics and music of the track "Heart of Darkness" appear again as a recurrent motif in the later Chris de Burgh album Moonfleet & Other Stories, released in 2010, particularly in the track "The Light on the Bay".

Personnel

 Chris de Burgh – lead and backing vocals, additional acoustic guitar (2, 8, 9)
 Danny McBride – electric guitar, lead guitar
 Geoff Richardson – acoustic guitar, viola (1)
 Jamie West-Oram – electric guitar (6)
 John Giblin – bass
 Rupert Hine – keyboards
 Michael Witzel – drums, percussion
 Tim Sanders – saxophone
 Paddy Moloney – arrangements (7)
 Miriam Stockley – additional backing vocals (4, 6, 9)
 Linda Taylor – additional backing  vocals (4, 6, 9)

Production

 Produced by Rupert Hine
 Engineered and mixed by Stephen W. Tayler at Metropolis Studios (London, England).
 Assistant technician – James Cadsky
 Art direction and design – Norman Service
 Photography – Richard Haughton
 Management – Dave Margereson and Kenny Thomson for Mismanagement, Inc.

Charts and certifications

Weekly charts

Year-end charts

Certifications

References

Chris de Burgh albums
1992 albums
Albums produced by Rupert Hine
A&M Records albums